Harold Klunder  (born 1943) is a Canadian painter.

Career
Born in Deventer, The Netherlands, Klunder immigrated with his family to Canada in 1952. He studied art at the Central Technical School, Toronto.

In 1994, he began to teach at Memorial University of Newfoundland and in 1997-1998, he taught at University of Lethbridge, Alberta.

Work
Klunder is principally known for his abstract paintings which are based on a non-traditional notion of "the self-portrait". They often feature an abundant use of paint, applied in layers, and take years to complete. From 1971 to 1979, he  used images and patterns often taken from found objects and geometric shapes. He began using oils in 1980 instead of acrylic, thus increasing the sense of materiality of the paint. In the early 1980s, he began developing a figural reference through drawing. By the mid-1980s, Klunder created "portraits" in paint, using his abstract language. He called such work "psychic realism" and his use of an expressionist element was in touch with international painting. In about 1997, his work became more open and brighter, but still suggested figural elements.

Selected exhibitions, collections and memberships
His work has been widely exhibited, both in Canada and abroad. In 1996, the Tom Thomson Memorial Gallery in Owen Sound organized an exhibition, as did Museum London in 1999. In 2020, his work was included in  Painting Nature with a Mirror, a group show from the collection of the Musée d’art contemporain de Montréal. His work is also included in public collections such as the National Gallery of Canada, the Art Gallery of Ontario, and the Art Gallery of Newfoundland and Labrador. He was made a member of the Royal Canadian Academy of Arts.

Personal life
In 1983, he moved to Flesherton, Ontario, northwest of Toronto.  In 1980, he moved to Montreal where he lives now with his partner Catherine Carmichael and best friend/artist Shane West. His daughter Saskia Carmichael Klunder, actress/dancer, lives in Montreal, Quebec, and Elizabeth Carmichael Klunder lives in Toronto, Ontario. 
Klunder also has a son, Willem Klunder, living in Europe (from a previous marriage).

References

Bibliography 

1943 births
Artists from Toronto
People from Deventer
Canadian male painters
Living people
Members of the Royal Canadian Academy of Arts
20th-century Canadian painters
21st-century Canadian painters
Abstract painters
Dutch emigrants to Canada
Canadian abstract artists
20th-century Canadian male artists
21st-century Canadian male artists